This is a list of Canadian films which were released in 1986:

See also
 1986 in Canada
 1986 in Canadian television

1986
1986 in Canadian cinema
Canada